The Ilyushin Il-4 (DB-3F) was a Soviet twin-engined long-range bomber and torpedo bomber, widely used by the Soviet Air Force and Soviet Naval Aviation during World War II.

Design and development
In 1938, the Ilyushin design bureau redesigned the Ilyushin DB-3 to ease production and improve its performance, the revised version receiving the designation DB-3F (Forsirovanniye or "boosted"). The aircraft's internal structure, particularly the wings, was extensively changed, eliminating the need for hand finishing of the structure, and with duralumin replacing the large scale use of steel in the earlier version. The aircraft's fuel system was redesigned, increasing its internal capacity while reducing the number of fuel tanks. The fuselage nose was lengthened to give more room for the navigator/bombardier while reducing drag. The prototype DB-3F, powered by the same  Tumansky M-87B engines of the DB-3M, was piloted on its maiden flight by Vladimir Kokkinaki on 21 May 1939. It successfully passed through state acceptance tests and entered production in January 1940, with the  Tumansky M-88 quickly replacing the M-87. The DB-3F was redesignated Il-4 in March 1942. Some series had wooden outer wings and front fuselages to conserve metals, and throughout the production, engines and fuel tanks were upgraded for improved performance while retaining the same range. However the most notable change was the addition of larger defensive guns in the turret, using the 12.7 mm (0.5 in) UBT machine gun in place of the earlier 7.62 mm (0.3 in) weapons. In addition, it was found that the gunners were attacked first, so blocks of armor were placed around the gunner positions.

This extra weight was not offset by the newer engines however, and the Il-4 proved to be slower than the earlier versions at only 404 km/h (251 mph). An attempt to improve performance was made as the Il-6, adding large diesel engines and heavier armament. The engines proved unreliable and production was never started. The Il-4 remained in production until 1945, when just over 5,200 had been built.

Operational history

Soviet Union 
Although the Il-4 was only a medium bomber, it had the range to be used on strategic missions. The use of the bombers in this role was not a priority for the VVS, but nevertheless the Il-4 was used on several long-range bombing raids against Berlin in 1941. Most would be used on much shorter range missions, often adding another 1,000 kg (2,204 lb) of bombs under the wings, in addition to the internal 2,500 kg (5,512 lb).

Finland 
Finland bought four captured DB-3Fs from German stocks. These were given the Finnish Air Force serials DF-22 to DF-25 and flown from Bryansk, Russia to Finland (one aircraft, DF-22, was destroyed en route and crashed near Syeschtschinskaya airfield). The aircraft were later flown by No. 48 Sqn during 1943 (DF-23, DF-24 and DF-25), No. 46 Sqn during 1944 (DF-23 and DF-24) and No. 45 Sqn for a short time in 1945 (DF-23), until the last remaining serviceable aircraft went into depot on February 23, 1945. After the war, DF-25 was lost in a snowstorm, landed on the ice and crashed into the woods in Öja near the city of Kokkola. Most parts of the plane were rescued and taken to a depot.

Operators

 Chinese Nationalist Air Force 24 aircraft

 Finnish Air Force 11 aircraft of the type DB-3M and four aircraft of the type DB-3F (Il-4)

 Luftwaffe (tests only)

 Soviet Air Force
Regiments as at 1945-46:
10th Guards Bomber Aviation Regiment
290th Bomber Aviation Regiment
303rd Bomber Aviation Regiment (Zavitinsk, Amur Oblast)
442nd Bomber Aviation Regiment (Belogorsk, Amur Oblast) with Il-4
other regiments
 Soviet Naval Aviation

Specifications (Il-4)

See also

References

Notes

Bibliography

 "From DB-3 To Il-4...The Soviet Long-Range Bomber: Part Two". Air International, Vol. 30, No. 3, March 1986. Bromley, UK: Fine Scroll. ISSN 0306-5634. pp. 133–138, 154–155.
 Gordon, Yefim and Khazanov, Dmitri. Soviet Combat Aircraft of the Second World War, Volume 2: Twin-Engined Fighters, Attack Aircraft and Bombers. Earl Shilton, UK: Midland Publishing Ltd., 2006. 
 Gordon, Yefim, Dmitriy Komissarov and Sergey Komissarov. OKB Ilyushin: A History of the Design Bureau and its Aircraft. London: Ian Allan, 2004. .
 Gunston, Bill. The Osprey Encyclopedia of Russian Aircraft 1875–1995. London: Osprey, 1995. .
 Keskinen, Kalevi; Stenman, Kari and Niska, Klaus. Suomen Ilmavoimien Historia 9, Venäläiset Pommittajat (Soviet Bombers). Espoo, Finland: Tietoteos, 1982. .
 Nowarra, Heinz J. and Duval, G.R. Russian Civil and Military Aircraft, 1884-1969. London: Fountain Press Ltd., 1971. .
 Stapfer, Hans-Heiri. Ilyushin Il-4 in Action (aircraft number 192). Carrollton, Texas: Squadron/Signal Publications, Inc., 2004. .

Il-004
1930s Soviet bomber aircraft
World War II Soviet medium bombers
Low-wing aircraft
Aircraft first flown in 1936
Twin piston-engined tractor aircraft